Udayagiri Raja Maha Vihara (Sinhalaː උදයගිරි රජ මහා විහාරය) is an ancient Buddhist Temple situated in Ampara District, Sri Lanka. The temple has been built in the village called Udayagiri, and located about  distance to Ampara – Mahaoya Road. The temple has been formally recognised by the Government as an archaeological site in Sri Lanka.

History

It is believed that the history of this temple goes back over 1000 years. But according to the features of archaeological remains in the Vihara premises, archaeologists assume that this temple may have been established during the pre–Christian era. A stone pillar with an inscription at the entrance of Vihara states that this Vihara was exempted from taxes by two generals of King Udaya I (901 - 912).

References

Notes

 

Buddhist temples in Ampara District
Archaeological protected monuments in Ampara District